Live in the 80's is a live album by Australian rock band Skyhooks. It was released by Mushroom Records in November 1983 in Australia and was certified gold.

The album cover is a 'live' reenactment of their Living in the 70's album cover.

Background
Skyhooks had announced their split in 1980, following the release of Hot for the Orient. In late 1982, Mushroom Records had released a megamix of their hits, titled "Hooked on Hooks", which peaked at number 21 in Australia. A boxed set of albums was produced in early 1983 and an unsuccessful attempt was made to persuade the group to reconvene for the major music festival Narara. Soon afterwards, responding to a strong nationwide demand, a tour was announced featuring the group line-up as it appeared on its first two albums. The Melbourne shows on 29 and 30 April 1983 were recorded and released. Seven of the eleven tracks included originally appeared on the group's ten-track debut album; the remaining four songs were hit singles from the group's subsequent history. Hot for the Orient, which did not feature either Strachan or Symons, was not represented.

Track listing

Charts

Personnel
 Alan Mitchell – cover photography
 Karen McGregor – design, art direction
 Doug Brady – engineering assistance
 Bill Canty – keyboards
 Michael Gudinski – management
 Mark Wojt – inner sleeve photography
 Peter Pryor – inner sleeve photography
 Greg Macainsh – bass guitar, production
 Jim Barton – production, engineering

References

External links
Album at Discogs

1983 live albums
Live albums by Australian artists
Skyhooks (band) albums
Mushroom Records live albums